Solitaire is any tabletop game which one can play by oneself, or a single-player game of concentration and skill using a set layout of tiles, pegs or stones.

Solitaire may also refer to:

Birds
Solitaire (bird), a bird group in the thrush family
Night parrot, Pezoporus occidentalis, or solitaire, an endangered bird of Australia
Réunion solitaire, Threskiornis solitarius, an extinct bird
Rodrigues solitaire, Pezophaps solitaria, an extinct bird

Film and television
Le Solitaire, a 1987 French film
Solitaire (1991 film), a Canadian drama film
Solitaire (2008 film), a drama film 
Solitaire, 2016 Lebanese comedy film with Bassam Kousa
"Solitaire", a 1977 episode of Police Woman
"Solitaire", a 1996 episode of Dave's World
Solitaire (James Bond), a Bond girl in Live and Let Die
Solitaire Island, a fictional island in the 1995 "Watergate" episode of seaQuest DSV

Gaming
Mahjong solitaire, a tile game
Microsoft Solitaire, a computer game
Peg solitaire, a board game
Solitaire, a non-player character from Dragon Quest Monsters: Joker
Klondike (solitaire), a solitaire game known in North America as simply "Solitaire"

Literature
Solitaire (comics), a 1993 superhero comic book series
Solitaire (novel), a 2002 novel by Kelley Eskridge
Solitaire (audio drama), a 2010 Doctor Who audiobook
Solitaire (James Bond), a Bond girl in Live and Let Die
Solitaire, a 2014 novel by Alice Oseman

Music
The Solitaires, an American doo wop group
Solitaire (musician) or James Callahan (born 1965), a 1980s synth pop performer
Solitair (born 1975), hip-hop MC and producer from Toronto
Solitaire, a dance music duo consisting of Pump Friction (Lewis Dene) and Dave Taylor

Albums
Solitude/Solitaire, a 1986 album by Peter Cetera
Solitaire (Edenbridge album) (2010)
Solitaire (Neil Sedaka album) (1972)
Solitaire (Andy Williams album) (1973)
Solitaire (Uri Caine album) (2001)
Solitaire, a 2002 album by Doc Gynéco
Solitaire, a 2014 album by Shy'm

Songs
"The Way"/"Solitaire", a 2004 double A-side by Clay Aiken 
"Solitaire" (Laura Branigan song) (1983)
"Solitaire" (Neil Sedaka song) (1972)
"Solitaire", a 1973 song and 1993 single by Tony Christie
"Solitaire", a 1993 song by Deep Purple from The Battle Rages On...
"Solitaire", a 1955 song by Erroll Garner
"Solitaire", a 2007 song by Kamelot from Ghost Opera
"Solitaire", a 2012 song by Kamelot from Silverthorn
"Solitaire", a 205 song by Marina and the Diamonds from Froot
"Solitaire/Unraveling", a 2001 song by Mushroomhead from XX

Transportation and military
Solitaire (ship), a 1971 pipe-laying ship
French ship Solitaire (1774) or HMS Solitaire
HMS Solitaire, a ship of the Royal Navy
Rutan Solitaire, a motorglider
Solitaire, a variant of the Mitsubishi MU-2 aircraft

Other uses
Solitaire (ballet), a 1956 ballet by Kenneth MacMillan
Solitaire (cipher), a cryptographic algorithm 
Solitaire (jewellery)
Solitaire, Namibia, a settlement
Solitaires of Port-Royal, a 17th-century French community

See also
List of patience games
Saltair (disambiguation)
Saltaire, a Victorian model village near Bradford, England 
Solitary (disambiguation)
Solitair Brickell, a high rise under construction in Miami